Robert Maunsell (24 October 1810 – 19 April 1894) was a New Zealand missionary, linguist and translator. He was born in Milford, near Limerick, Ireland on 24 October 1810.

Robert Maunsell joined the Church Missionary Society and arrived in the Bay of Islands in  1835 and was appointed to Te Waimate mission, and he was sent to established the Manukau mission station that same year; where he operated a school. From 1849 to 1865 he worked at Te Kohanga Mission near Port Waikato, including during the Invasion of the Waikato, which was the response of the colonial government 
to the Kingitanga Movement.

After 1844 the Rev. Robert Maunsell worked with William Williams on the revision of the translation of the Bible into the Māori language. William Williams concentrated on the revision of the New Testament; Maunsell worked on the revision of the Old Testament, portions of which were published in 1840 with the full translation completed in 1857.

In 1845 the Book of Common Prayer was translated by a committee comprising William Williams, Robert Maunsell, James Hamlin and William Puckey.

He was Archdeacon of Waitemata from 1868 to 1870; and then Archdeacon of Auckland until 1883.

He died on 19 April 1894 at Parnell, New Zealand.

References

External links
 
 

1810 births
1894 deaths
Anglican missionaries in New Zealand
Irish Anglican missionaries
New Zealand translators
Linguists from New Zealand
Archdeacons of Waitemata
19th-century translators
British Anglican missionaries
Missionary linguists
Translators of the Bible into Māori